Marklew is a surname. Notable people with the surname include:

Ernest Marklew (1874–1939), British politician
Roger Marklew (1940–2006), English footballer